Opera is a multi-platform web browser developed by its namesake company Opera. The browser is based on Chromium, but distinguishes itself from other Chromium-based browsers (Chrome, Edge, etc.) through its user interface and other features.

Opera was initially released on 10 April 1995, making it one of the oldest desktop web browsers still actively developed. It was commercial software for its first ten years and had its own proprietary layout engine, Presto. In 2013, it switched from the Presto engine to Chromium.

Opera is available on Windows, macOS, Linux, Android, and iOS (Safari WebKit engine). There are also mobile versions called Opera Mobile and Opera Mini. Opera users also have access to Opera News, a news app based on an AI platform.

The company released a gaming-oriented version of the browser, Opera GX, in 2019, and a blockchain-focused Opera Crypto Browser into public beta in January 2022.

History

In 1994, Jon Stephenson von Tetzchner and Geir Ivarsøy started developing the Opera web browser while working at Telenor, a Norwegian telecommunications company.

In 1995, they founded Opera Software AS. Opera was initially released on 10 April 1995, and then it was released publicly in 1996 with version 2.10, which ran on Microsoft Windows 95. Development for mobile device platforms started in 1998.

Opera 4.0, released in 2000, included a new cross-platform core that facilitated the creation of editions of Opera for multiple operating systems and platforms.

To this point, Opera was trialware and had to be purchased after the trial period. With version 5.0, released in 2000, Opera became ad-sponsored, displaying ads to users who had not paid for it. Subsequent versions have given users the choice of seeing banner ads or targeted text ads from Google.

With version 8.5, released in 2005, the ads were completely removed, and the browser's primary financial support came through revenue from Google (by contract, Opera's default search engine).

Among new features introduced in version 9.1, released in 2006, was fraud protection using technology from GeoTrust, a digital certificate provider, and PhishTank, an organization that tracks known phishing web sites. This feature was further expanded in version 9.5, when GeoTrust was replaced with Netcraft, and malware protection from Haute Secure was added.

In 2006, Opera Software ASA was released as well as Internet Channel and Nintendo DS Browser for Nintendo's DS and Wii gaming systems.

A new JavaScript engine, called Carakan (after the Javanese alphabet), was introduced with version 10.50. According to Opera Software, it made Opera 10.50 more than seven times faster in SunSpider than Opera 10.10.

On 16 December 2010, Opera 11 was released, featuring extensions, tab stacking (where dragging one tab over another allowed creating a group of tabs), visual mouse gestures and changes to the address bar. Opera 12 was released on 14 June 2012.

On 12 February 2013, Opera Software announced that it would drop its own Presto layout engine in favor of WebKit as implemented by Google's Chrome browser, using code from the Chromium project. Opera Software planned as well to contribute code to WebKit. On 3 April 2013, Google announced it would fork components from WebKit to form a new layout engine, Blink. That day, Opera Software confirmed it would follow Google in implementing Blink.

On 28 May 2013, a beta release of Opera 15 was made available, the first version based on the Chromium project. Many distinctive Opera features of the previous versions were dropped, and Opera Mail was separated into a standalone application derived from Opera 12.

In January 2017, the source code of Opera 12.15, one of the last few versions still based on the Presto layout engine, was leaked.

To demonstrate how radically different a browser could look, Opera Neon, dubbed a "concept browser", was released in January 2017. PC World compared it to demo models that automakers and hardware vendors release to show their visions of the future. Instead of a Speed Dial (also explained in the following chapter, "Features"), it displays the frequently accessed websites in resemblance to a desktop with computer icons scattered over it in an artistic formation.

Features

Opera has originated features later adopted by other web browsers, including: Speed Dial, pop-up blocking, reopening recently closed pages, private browsing, and tabbed browsing. Additional features include a built-in screenshot tool, Snapshot, which also includes an image-markup tool; built-in ad blockers, and tracking blockers.

Built-in messengers
Opera’s desktop browser includes access to social media messaging apps WhatsApp, Telegram, Facebook Messenger, Twitter, Instagram, TikTok, and VK.

Usability and accessibility
Opera includes a bookmarks bar and a download manager. It also has "Speed Dial" which allows the user to add an unlimited number of pages shown in thumbnail form in a page displayed when a new tab is opened.

Opera was one of the first browsers to support Cascading Style Sheets (CSS) in 1998.

Opera Turbo, a feature that compresses requested web pages (except HTTPS pages) before sending them to the users, is no longer available on the desktop browser. Opera Turbo is available in Opera Mini, the mobile browser.

Privacy and security

One security feature is the option to delete private data, such as HTTP cookies, browsing history, items in cache and passwords with the click of a button. 

When visiting a site, Opera displays a security badge in the address bar which shows details about the website, including security certificates. Opera's fraud and malware protection warns the user about suspicious web pages and is enabled by default. It checks the requested page against several databases of known phishing and malware websites, called blacklists.

In 2016, a free virtual private network (VPN) service was implemented in the browser. Opera said that this would allow encrypted access to websites otherwise blocked, and provide security on public WiFi networks. It was later determined that the browser VPN operated as a web proxy rather than a VPN, meaning that it only secured connections made by the browser and not by any other apps on the computer.

Crypto-wallet-support
In 2018, a built-in cryptocurrency wallet to the Opera Web Browser was released, announcing that they would be the first browser with a built-in Crypto Wallet. On 13 December 2018, Opera released a video showing many decentralized applications like Cryptokitties running on the Android version of the Opera Web Browser.

In March 2020, Opera updated its Android browser to access crypto domains, making it the first browser to be able to support a domain name system (DNS) which is not part of the traditional DNS directly without the need of a plugin or add-on. This was through a collaboration with a San Francisco based startup, Unstoppable Domains. 

In January 2022, Opera introduced Opera Crypto Browser into public beta, combining a non-custodial wallet with a dedicated browser for blockchain enabled services and Web3 technologies. On April 14 2022, Opera launched its Crypto Browser available on iOS devices.

Other versions

Opera GX

Opera GX is a gaming-oriented counterpart of Opera. The browser was announced and released in early access for Windows on 11 June 2019, during E3 2019. The macOS version was released in December of the same year.

Opera GX adds features geared toward gamers on top of the regular Opera browser. The browser allows users to limit network, CPU, and memory usage to preserve system resources, with GX Cleaner, a tool that allows users to clear cache, cookies, and other junk. It also adds integrations with other apps such as Twitch, Discord, Twitter, and Instagram. The browser also has a built-in page called the GX Corner, which collates gaming-related releases, deals, and news articles.

On 20 May 2021, Opera released a mobile version of Opera GX on iOS and Android.

Development-stages
Opera Software uses a release cycle consisting of three "streams", corresponding to phases of development, that can be downloaded and installed independently of each other: "developer", "beta", and "stable". New features are first introduced in the developer build, then, depending on user feedback, may progress to the beta version and eventually be released.

The developer stream allows early testing of new features, mainly targeting developers, extension creators, and early adopters. Opera developer is not intended for everyday browsing as it is unstable and is prone to failure or crashing, but it enables advanced users to try out new features that are still under development, without affecting their normal installation of the browser. New versions of the browser are released frequently, generally a few times a week.

The beta stream, formerly known as "Opera Next," is a feature complete package, allowing stability and quality to mature before the final release. A new version is released every couple of weeks.

Both streams can be installed alongside the official release without interference. Each has a different icon to help the user distinguish between the variants.

Market-adoption

Integrations
In 2005, Adobe Systems integrated Opera's rendering engine, Presto, into its Adobe Creative Suite applications. Opera technology was employed in Adobe GoLive, Adobe Photoshop, Adobe Dreamweaver, and other components of the Adobe Creative Suite. Opera's layout engine is also found in Virtual Mechanics SiteSpinner Pro. The Internet Channel is a version of the Opera 9 web browser for use on the Nintendo Wii created by Opera Software and Nintendo. Opera Software is also implemented in the Nintendo DS Browser and Nintendo DSi Browser for Nintendo's handheld systems.

Opera is the fifth most popular web-browser. As of April 2021, Opera's offerings had over 320 million active users.

Reception
The Opera browser has been listed as a "tried and tested direct alternative to Chrome". It scores close to Chrome on the HTML5test, which scores browsers’ compatibility with different web standards.

Versions with the Presto layout engine have been positively reviewed, although they have been criticized for website compatibility issues. Because of this issue, Opera 8.01 and higher had included workarounds to help certain popular but problematic web sites display properly.

Versions with the Blink layout engine have been criticized by some users for missing features such as UI customization, and for abandoning Opera Software's own Presto layout engine. Despite that, versions with the Blink layout engine have been noted for being fast and stable, for handling the latest web standards and for having a better website compatibility and a modern-style user interface.

See also
Opera browser platform variants:
 Opera Mini: a browser for tablets and telephones
 Opera Mobile: a browser for tablets and telephones
Related other browsers: 
Otter Browser: an open-source browser that recreates some aspects of the classic Opera
Vivaldi: a freeware browser created by former Opera Software employees 
Related topics:
 Comparison of browser synchronizers
 History of the web browser
 List of pop-up blocking software
 List of web browsers
 Timeline of web browsers

References

External links

 

 
C++ software
Cross-platform web browsers
Embedded Linux
Freeware

OS/2 web browsers
MacOS web browsers
Pocket PC software
Portable software
POSIX web browsers
Proprietary cross-platform software
Proprietary freeware for Linux
Science and technology in Norway
Software based on WebKit
Software companies of Norway
Telenor
Windows web browsers
1994 software
1995 software
Computer-related introductions in 1995
BSD software